Lock Port is an unincorporated community in Williams County, in the U.S. state of Ohio.

History
A sawmill was built at Lockport in 1834. A post office called Lockport was established in 1837, and remained in operation until 1876.

References

Unincorporated communities in Williams County, Ohio
Unincorporated communities in Ohio